Rockingham railway station is a railway station in Rockingham, a suburb of Perth, Western Australia. It is on the Mandurah railway line, which is part of the Transperth commuter rail network. It has two side platforms, linked by a pedestrian overpass accessed by stairs, a lift, and escalators. Services run every 10 minutes during peak, and every 15 minutes between peak. The station has a bus interchange with twelve bus stands, and 14 regular bus routes.

The station opened on 23 December 2007, along with the rest of the Mandurah line.

Description
Rockingham railway station is in Rockingham, Western Australia, a suburb of Perth. It is located east of the intersection of Ennis Avenue and Rae Road. The land on which the station lies was originally reserved for a road interchange. The adjacent stations are Wellard railway station towards Perth, and Warnbro railway station towards Mandurah.

The station consists of two side platforms. Platform one can be accessed through fare gates from the western side. Platform two is linked to platform one by a pedestrian overpass, which can be accessed by stairs, an escalator, or a lift. The station has a large roof covering much of the platforms. The station is fully accessible.

Outside the station building's entrance is a twelve stand bus interchange. West of the bus interchange is the station's car park. There is another car park on the western side of Ennis Avenue, which can be accessed on foot via an underpass under Ennis Avenue, or by the several bus routes that pass that car park. Parking costs $2 per day on weekdays, and in total, the station has 1,950 standard parking bays, 23 short term parking bays, 16 motorcycle bays, and disabled bays. Other facilities at the station include toilets, and a transit officer booth.

History

A timber railway from Jarrahdale to Rockingham was built in the 19th century, crossing the main South Western Railway line from Perth to Bunbury at Mundijong. It ran closely along what is now Patterson Road and terminated at the jetty at Mangles Bay. As well as freight there were also excursion trains along the line. However, over time it became cheaper to load timber at the deep-water port in Fremantle and the rails were removed in 1949. The street name Railway Terrace in central Rockingham is a legacy of this line.

Planning
Under the original 1999 Southern Suburbs Railway plan, Rockingham station would have been located within the Rockingham central business district in close proximity to major shopping and civic areas. This plan proposed the line to access Rockingham CBD by tunnel.

However, in 2002, the Southern Suburbs Railway (Mandurah line) was altered to operate via a more direct route from Perth via the median strip of the Kwinana Freeway rather than via the Armadale and Kwinana lines as originally planned. The planned central Rockingham station was abandoned at this time, in order to offset the extra cost of the Perth leg. The new location avoided the cost of tunnelling under Rockingham, but was now located on the edge of the city rather than in the centre of it two kilometres east of Rockingham Shopping Centre.

To offset this, the State Government announced plans to construct a light rail link to the Rockingham CBD instead. This did not transpire, although provision was made in the station design and layout for it. Evidence of the abandoned light rail is seen in the busway approach to the station, where concrete 'tracks' can be seen. These would have accommodated rail inset into a concrete base and presumably can still be used in this way in the future. The light rail track would have ended at a platform under the existing station canopy near the western entrance.

Construction
The design and construction of the Mandurah railway line was split up into eight "packages". Rockingham station, along with Mandurah station and Warnbro station, was part of Package C. Rockingham station was designed by Jones Coulter Young Architects. The station was designed as a major regional bus/rail transfer station. The $32 million contract for building Rockingham station and Warnbro station was awarded to a joint venture between Doric Constructions and Brierty Contractors in June 2005.

Construction on the station began in August 2005. The station opened along with the rest of the Mandurah line on 23 December 2007.

Services
Rockingham railway station is served by the Mandurah railway line on the Transperth network. The line goes between Mandurah railway station and Perth railway station, continuing north from there as the Joondalup railway line. Mandurah line trains stop at the station every 10 minutes during peak on weekdays, and every 15 minutes during the day outside peak every day of the year except Christmas Day. At night, trains are half-hourly, or hourly. Rockingham station is the terminus and starting point of K stopping pattern. The pattern operates once per day in each direction at the beginning of peak in the early morning. The station saw 1,178,710 boardings in the 2013–14 financial year.

Buses
Rockingham station has a bus interchange with twelve bus stands: six on either side of the bus road. 14 regular bus routes serve the station, as well as rail replacement services, which operate as route 909, and school routes.

Stands 1–6

Stands 7–12

References

External links

Mandurah line
Railway stations in Perth, Western Australia
Railway stations in Australia opened in 2007
City of Rockingham
Bus stations in Perth, Western Australia